Gaby Hollis Lewis (born 27 March 2001) is an Irish international cricketer who made her senior debut for the Irish national team in July 2014, aged only 13. She made her Twenty20 International (T20I) debut later in the year, becoming the youngest to play at that level. The International Cricket Council (ICC) named Lewis as one of the five breakout stars in women's cricket in 2018. She currently captains the Women's Super Series team Scorchers. In June 2022, at the age of 21, Lewis became the youngest player to captain the Ireland Women's team in international cricket.

Early life
Lewis was born in Dublin. Her older sister, Robyn Lewis, has played alongside her both at club and national level, while her father, Alan Lewis, and grandfather, Ian Lewis, both represented the Irish men's side. Both members of Dublin's YMCA Cricket Club, the Lewis sisters first came to attention in November 2013, when they were named in Cricket Ireland's Emerging Players Squad. Gaby Lewis was first called up to Ireland's senior team in July 2014, playing five matches against English county sides in the ECB Women's Twenty20 Cup. She subsequently made her international debut in August, playing twice against the Netherlands at the 2014 European Championship. In the second of those matches, she scored 38 from 35 balls coming in third in the batting order, which included a 94-run partnership with Clare Shillington (20 years her elder).

Domestic career
Lewis has played in the Women's Super Series for Dragons and Scorchers, and began captaining Scorchers ahead of the 2020 season. On 12 August 2021, Lewis was signed as a replacement player for Southern Brave in The Hundred, after Smriti Mandhana returned home. She played two matches for the side, scoring just 9 runs. She was also signed by Southern Vipers for the remainder of their 2021 Rachael Heyhoe Flint Trophy campaign. She played four matches, scoring 97 runs at an average of 24.25, as the side won the competition. In 2022, she was signed by Northern Superchargers in The Hundred as a replacement for the injured Jemimah Rodrigues.

International career
In September 2014, Lewis was selected in Ireland's squad for a three-match T20I series against South Africa, played at a neutral venue in Birmingham, England. She sat the first game out, but was included for the final two games, scoring five runs on debut and then 12 not out in the third game. On debut, Lewis was 13 years and 166 days old, breaking the record set by her teammate Lucy O'Reilly for the youngest T20I player. She also became the first international cricketer born in the 21st century. Across all men's and women's international cricket (Tests, ODIs, and T20Is), only Pakistan's Sajjida Shah has played at a younger age.

After her debut series against South Africa, Lewis next played at international level in August 2015, when she was named in Ireland's squad for a three-match series against Australia. In the first match, she came in sixth in the batting order, and scored 23 runs from 30 balls, behind only Cecelia Joyce. She had less success, however, in the other matches, scoring four runs in the second game and ten in the third. Later in the year, Lewis also played in the 2015 World Twenty20 Qualifier in Thailand. At the 2016 World Twenty20 in India, she played in two of her team's matches (against New Zealand and Sri Lanka), but had little impact.

In June 2018, she was named in Ireland's squad for the 2018 ICC Women's World Twenty20 Qualifier tournament. The following month she was named in the ICC Women's Global Development Squad. In October 2018, she was named in Ireland's squad for the 2018 ICC Women's World Twenty20 tournament in the West Indies.

In August 2019, she was the leading run-scorer in the 2019 Netherlands Women's Quadrangular Series, with 180 runs from six matches. The following month, she was named in Ireland's squad for the 2019 ICC Women's World Twenty20 Qualifier tournament in Scotland. In July 2020, she was awarded a part-time professional contract by Cricket Ireland for the following year.

In August 2021, Lewis was named in Ireland's squad for the 2021 ICC Women's T20 World Cup Europe Qualifier in Spain. In Ireland's opening match of the tournament, against Germany, Lewis scored 105 not out to become the first cricketer for Ireland to score a century in a WT20I match. In November 2021, she was named in Ireland's team for the 2021 Women's Cricket World Cup Qualifier tournament in Zimbabwe.

In May 2022, Lewis was named as the captain of Ireland's team for their home series against South Africa. In the first match of the tour, Lewis scored her 1,000th run in WT20I cricket. In the next match, Lewis earned her 50th cap in the format. On 26 August 2022, Lewis earned her 100th international cap for Ireland, scoring 92 in her side's victory against the Netherlands.

References

Further reading

External links

2001 births
Living people
Ireland women One Day International cricketers
Ireland women Twenty20 International cricketers
Irish women cricketers
Cricketers from Dublin (city)
Dragons (women's cricket) cricketers
Scorchers (women's cricket) cricketers
Southern Brave cricketers
Southern Vipers cricketers
Northern Superchargers cricketers